Kallinikos or Latinized Callinicus ( fl. 650 AD) was a Jewish-Byzantine architect and chemist from Heliopolis of Syria in Baalbek. He is credited with the invention of  Greek fire, a naval weapon somewhat resembling the modern flamethrower. According to Constantine Porphyrogenitus, Callinicus was a refugee from Heliopolis of Syria who arrived in Byzantium in the time of Constantine IV and shared his knowledge of liquid fire with the Byzantines. Callinicus’ exact formula was a carefully guarded secret, and remains unknown today. Possible ingredients include resin, asphalt,  sulfur, naphtha, fine quicklime, and calcium phosphide.

See also

References

Byzantine architects
7th-century Byzantine scientists
7th-century Byzantine people
Byzantine Jews
Syrian Jews
7th-century architects